Ermenegildo De Stefano (born in Naples Italy) is an Italian journalist, music critic and musicologist. He specializes in African-American music. He is a music journalist, sociologist, and critic for the Italian daily Roma and art director of the Italian Festival of Ragtime.

Early life 
He earned a degree in Sociology of Communications.

Career 
He began collaborating with RAI Radio in the 1980s, for which he conducted jazz programs and regularly published essays on  published by RAI.

He organizes courses of Afro-American music and Creative Writing workshops in various Italian universities and music conservatories including San Pietro a Majella.

He is the author of the only ragtime history in Italian language, published by Marsilio Editori (Venice) in two editions, in 1984 and in 1991. In the mid-1990s, he won a national prize for journalism of the Ministry of Infrastructure and Transport to coincide with the arrival among finalists of literary , and in the 2018 the Campania Felix International Journalism Award.

He collaborates with the Foundation for the Encyclopedia Italiana Treccani for African-American voices and other international journals as the Canadian CODA magazine.

He is a member of the National Union of Writers and Artists.

Works 

 AfroAmerican Songs, Gammalibri Editions, Milan 1982.
 History of Ragtime: origins, evolution, technique, 1880–1980, Marsilio Editions, Venice 1984 
 Three hundred years of Jazz: 1619–1919 – The origins of Afro-American music between sociology and anthropology, SugarCo Editions, Milan 1986.
 Modern Jazz: 1940–1960 – Chronicle of creative two decades , Kaos Editions, Milan 1990.
 Frank Sinatra (biography), Marsilio Editions, Venice 1991.
 Vinicio Capossela (biography), Lombardi Editions, Milan 1993.
 Francesco Guccini (biography), Lombardi Editions, Milan 1993.
 Louis Armstrong (biography), Préface by Renzo Arbore, Italian Scientific Editions, Naples 1997.
 Vesuwiev Jazz, Italian Scientific Editions, Préface by Renzo Arbore, Naples 1999.
 Easy street story, L'Isola dei ragazzi Editions, Naples 2007 
 The people of samba: the story and the characters of Brazilian popular music, RAI Editions, Rome 2005.
 Around Ragtime and Jazz, Préface by Amiri Baraka, Introduction by Gianni Minà, Sugarco Editions, Milan 2007 
 The Voice. Life and Italian roots of Frank Sinatra, Préface by Renzo Arbore, Coniglio Editions, Rome 2011
 A social history of jazz, Préface by Zygmunt Bauman, Mimesis Editions, Milan 2014 
 Naples stories, Amazon.it, Naples 2015, ASIN: B00XMZ1HOI
 Saudade Bossa Nova: music, contamination and rhythms of Brazil, Preface by Chico Buarque, Introduction di Gianni Minà, Logisma Editions, Firenze 2017, 
 Frank Sinatra, l’italoamericano'', Preface by Renzo Arbore, LoGisma Editore, Florence 2021, ISBN 978-88-94926-42-2
 Ballata breve di un gatto da strada - La vita e la morte di Malcolm X, Preface by Claudio Gorlier, Postface by Walter Mauro, NUA Editions Brescia 2021, ISBN 978-88-31399-49-4

References 
  This article is partially or totally taken from the Italian Wikipedia's article Gildo De Stefano.

Notes

External links 

 

Living people
Journalists from Naples
Italian music journalists
Italian male journalists
Italian male writers
Writers from Naples
1953 births